Avelino Méndez Rangel (26 November 1958 – 25 January 2021) was a Mexican politician from the Party of the Democratic Revolution.

Biography
From 2009 to 2012, he served as a federal deputy in the LXI Legislature, representing the Federal District. He also served as borough mayor in Xochimilco and as undersecretary of government for Mexico City.

Rangel died in Mexico City on 25 January 2021, after being hospitalized with COVID-19 some days earlier, during the COVID-19 pandemic in Mexico.

References

1958 births
2021 deaths
Politicians from Mexico City
Party of the Democratic Revolution politicians
21st-century Mexican politicians
Deaths from the COVID-19 pandemic in Mexico
Members of the Chamber of Deputies (Mexico) for Mexico City